The Jaarbeurs (Dutch for 'Yearly Fair') is an exhibition and convention centre in Utrecht, the Netherlands. Noted events include the former Space '86, the Hobby Computer Club Days (HCC Dagen), and the Mega Record & CD Fair. The venue is also a regular base for music festivals like ASOT festival and Thunderdome.

The Jaarbeurs extends to an area of 100.000 m² next to Utrecht Centraal railway station.

The first Jaarbeurs was held in 1917. It was a major success from the start, opening up the city of Utrecht as a trade centre and giving it an economic boost.

See also
 Jaarbeurs Utrecht Marathon
 List of convention centres in the Netherlands

External links
Jaarbeurs website 
 HCC website

Convention centres in the Netherlands
Buildings and structures in Utrecht (city)
Tourist attractions in Utrecht (province)